NGC 288 is a globular cluster in the constellation Sculptor.  Its visual appearance was described by John Dreyer in 1888. It is located about 1.8° southeast of the galaxy NGC 253, 37′ north-northeast of the South Galactic Pole, 15′ south-southeast of a 9th magnitude star, and encompassed by a half-circular chain of stars that opens on its southwest side. It can be observed through binoculars. It is not very concentrated and has a well resolved, large 3′ dense core that is surrounded by a much more diffuse and irregular 9′ diameter ring. Peripheral members extend farther outward towards the south and especially southwest.

References

External links 
 
 
 

Globular clusters
Sculptor (constellation)
0288
17831027